This article shows statistics of individual players for the Osijek football club. It also lists all matches that Osijek played in the 2011–12 season.

First-team squad

Competitions

Overall

Prva HNL

Classification

Results summary

Results by round

Matches

Pre-season

Prva HNL

† Varaždin was expelled so the match was awarded as a 3–0 forfeit win to Osijek

Croatian Cup

Player seasonal records

Competitive matches only. Updated to games played 12 May 2012.

Goalscorers

Source: Competitive matches

Disciplinary record
Includes all competitive matches. Players with 1 card or more included only.

Source: Prva-HNL.hr

Appearances and goals

Source: Prva-HNL.hr

References

Croatian football clubs 2011–12 season
2011